CHRC-FM (92.5 MHz) is a commercial radio station licensed to Rockland, Ontario, Canada. The station is owned by Evanov Communications through licensee Dufferin Communications Inc. It broadcasts a country format and is branded as Hot Country 92.5. Some programming is simulcast with co-owned CKHK-FM in Hawkesbury.

CHRC has an effective radiated power (ERP) of 333 watts. It is on the same channel as 100,000 watt CKBE-FM Montreal, less than 100 kilometres away. That may cause interference in some areas between CHRC and CKBE-FM. These interference problems were addressed in the station's paperwork with the Canadian Radio-television and Telecommunications Commission (CRTC), which approved the application on February 25, 2013.

History

Soft AC "The Jewel"

In June 2013, the station was assigned the call letters CHRC-FM. That call sign was previously used by a now-defunct radio station in Quebec City.

On October 15, 2013, CHRC-FM signed on the air with a soft adult contemporary format. The station became one of "The Jewel" branded stations, with the slogan "Lite & Refreshing", and later "Lite Favourites". The station played a mix of pop hits and soft oldies from the 1970s, 80s, 90s and early 2000s. 

The morning show was hosted by Derrick Scott, in the industry for close to 30 years across Ontario. Scott was an advocate for local businesses, and "Shopping - Dining Local."  He was recognized by local charities and business groups for his efforts in promoting local businesses and charities over the years. The morning show was also simulcast on Jewel 107.7 in Hawkesbury. During the midday hours, CHRC carried the syndicated John Tesh Radio Show, known as "Intelligence for Your Life." In the evening, the station broadcast an adult standards program known as The Lounge, playing "Music With Style", often with content from the Great American Songbook. From 11pm to midnight, the station aired instrumental beautiful music pieces under the branding The International Concert Series.

Change to Hot Country
On May 2, 2021, Evanov announced that CHRC's soft adult contemporary format would flip to country. Hot Country 92.5 debuted on May 3, 2021. 

The change to Hot Country also came to Evanov's sister station, CKHK-FM 107.7 in Hawkesbury, with the stations sharing some programming.

References

External links
 Hot Country 92.5
 

Clarence-Rockland
HRC
HRC
HRC
Radio stations established in 2013
2013 establishments in Ontario